Neuchâtel Castle is a castle in the municipality of Neuchâtel of the Canton of Neuchâtel in Switzerland.  It is a Swiss heritage site of national significance.

See also
 List of castles in Switzerland
 Château

References

Cultural property of national significance in the canton of Neuchâtel
Castles in the canton of Neuchâtel
Neuchâtel